Loughborough is a constituency in Leicestershire represented in the House of Commons of the UK Parliament since 2019 by Jane Hunt, a Conservative. From 2010 until 2019, it was represented by Nicky Morgan, who served in the governments of David Cameron and Boris Johnson. In 2020, she was elevated to the Peerage and became a member of the House of Lords. The constituency is a considered a bellwether, as it has reflected the national result at every general election since February 1974.

Boundaries

1885–1918: The Sessional Division of Loughborough (except the parishes of Cossington, Seagrave, and Sileby), and parts of the Sessional Divisions of Ashby-de-la-Zouch and Leicester.

1918–1950: The Borough of Loughborough, the Urban Districts of Ashby-de-la-Zouch, Ashby Woulds, and Shepshed, the Rural Districts of Castle Donington and Loughborough, and the Rural District of Ashby-de-la-Zouch except the parish of Bardon.

1950–1955: The Borough of Loughborough, the Urban Districts of Ashby-de-la-Zouch, Ashby Woulds, and Shepshed, and the Rural Districts of Ashby-de-la-Zouch and Castle Donington.

1955–1974: The Borough of Loughborough, the Urban Districts of Ashby-de-la-Zouch, Ashby Woulds, and Shepshed, the Rural District of Ashby-de-la-Zouch as constituted by the County of Leicester (Coalville Urban District) Confirmation Order 1953, and the Rural District of Castle Donington.

1974–1983: The Borough of Loughborough, the Urban Districts of Ashby-de-la-Zouch, Ashby Woulds, and Shepshed, the Rural District of Ashby-de-la-Zouch as altered by the West Midland Counties Order 1965, and the Rural District of Castle Donington as altered by the East Midland Counties Order 1965 and the County of Leicester (Coalville Urban District) Confirmation Order 1969.

1983–1997: The Borough of Charnwood wards of Ashby, Barrow upon Soar and Quorndon, Birstall Goscote, Birstall Greengate, Birstall Netherhall, Birstall Riverside, Birstall Stonehill, Garendon, Hastings, Hathern, Lemyngton, Nanpantan, Mountsorrel and Rothley, Outwoods, Sileby, Southfields, Storer, The Wolds, Thurcaston, Woodhouse and Swithland, and Woodthorpe.

1997–2010: The Borough of Charnwood wards of Ashby, Barrow upon Soar and Quorndon, Garendon, Hastings, Hathern, Lemyngton, Nanpantan, Outwoods, Shepshed East, Shepshed West, Sileby, Southfields, Storer, The Wolds, and Woodthorpe.

2010–present: The Borough of Charnwood wards of Barrow and Sileby West, Loughborough Ashby, Loughborough Dishley and Hathern, Loughborough Garendon, Loughborough Hastings, Loughborough Lemyngton, Loughborough Nanpantan, Loughborough Outwoods, Loughborough Shelthorpe, Loughborough Southfields, Loughborough Storer, Quorn and Mountsorrel Castle, Shepshed East, Shepshed West, Sileby, and The Wolds.

History
Loughborough was originally part of a larger constituency, Leicestershire, which was split into two districts in the Reform Act of 1832.

In the Redistribution of Seats Act of 1885 Leicestershire was divided into five parts, Eastern (Melton), Mid [or] (Loughborough), Western (Bosworth) and Southern (Harborough), each returning one member, the last part was a borough constituency for Leicester which returned two MPs.

In 1983 the Leicestershire coalfield, an area loyal to Labour, was removed from the constituency and replaced by much of the Soar Valley, a rural area that tended to vote Conservative. Opencast coal mining is still relevant to the west of the seat only at Measham, one of the few high-profile excavations planned by Coalfield Resources PLC (formerly UK Coal). In 1995 the Soar Valley was moved to the newly created Charnwood constituency approximately reinstating the old version of the seat.

The last time that Loughborough was not represented by an MP from a governing political party was prior to the February 1974 general election, making the constituency a bellwether.

Members of Parliament

Elections

Elections in the 2010s

Elections in the 2000s
The 2005 general election saw Andy Reed returned with a decreased majority after his share of the vote dropped by 8.3%. Loughborough was the 126th target seat of the Conservative Party and their share of the vote increased slightly but the Liberal Democrats had the largest increase. The swing of 5.0% from Labour to Conservative was higher than the national swing of 3.0% and turnout was above average.

Elections in the 1990s

Elections in the 1980s

Elections in the 1970s

Elections in the 1960s

Elections in the 1950s

Elections in the 1940s

Elections in the 1930s

Elections in the 1920s

Elections in the 1910s

Elections in the 1900s

Elections in the 1890s

Elections in the 1880s

See also
List of parliamentary constituencies in Leicestershire and Rutland

Notes

References

Sources 

UK Genealogy Archives - History
BBC News: Loughborough constituency - History and Boundaries
Andy Reed MP | Loughborough Constituency - Boundaries
British Parliamentary Election results 1983-97 - Elections (1983–1992)
UK General Elections since 1832 - Elections (1951–1979)
McCalmont, Frederick Haynes, Stenton Michael, Vincent, John Russell. McCalmont's parliamentary poll book: British election results.
F. W. S. Craig. British Parliamentary Election Results 1950-1973.
F. W. S. Craig. British Parliamentary Election Results 1918-1949.

External links
BBC News: Voters 'concerned' at crime rise
Labour in Loughborough
Loughborough Conservatives
Loughborough Liberal Democrats
Map showing original Loughborough constituency (1895)

Parliamentary constituencies in Leicestershire
Constituencies of the Parliament of the United Kingdom established in 1885